WASP-35 is a G-type main-sequence star about 660 light-years away. The star's age cannot be well constrained, but it is probably older than the Sun. WASP-35 is similar in concentration of heavy elements compared to the Sun.

The star has no detectable starspot activity.

Planetary system
In 2011 a transiting hot Jupiter planet b  was detected.

References

Eridanus (constellation)
G-type main-sequence stars
Planetary systems with one confirmed planet
Planetary transit variables
J05041962-0613473
Durchmusterung objects